Centroberyx, often referred to as nannygais, is genus of ray-finned fishes found in the Indian Ocean and western Pacific Ocean, with the greatest species richness off southern Australia. They are reddish in colour and somewhat resemble the related soldierfish. Members of this genus are also known from fossils from the Cretaceous.

Species
There are currently seven recognized extant species in this genus:

 Centroberyx affinis (Günther, 1859) (Redfish)
 Centroberyx australis Shimizu & Hutchins, 1987 (Yelloweye nannygai)
 Centroberyx druzhinini (Busakhin, 1981)
 Centroberyx gerrardi (Günther, 1887) (Bight redfish)
 Centroberyx lineatus (G. Cuvier, 1829) (Swallow-tail)
 Centroberyx rubricaudus Chen-Hsiang Liu & S. C. Shen, 1985
 Centroberyx spinosus (Gilchrist, 1903) (Short alfonsino)

References

 
Extant Cretaceous first appearances
Marine fish genera
Taxa named by Theodore Gill